Andrew "Angel" Bartolotta (born November 26, 1981) is an American drummer. He is best known as the drummer for American alternative metal band Dope and for industrial metal band Genitorturers. He is also the founder of the large collaborative music project Team Cybergeist. In 2015, Angel released two instructional books, "So You Want to Be a Drummer" and "Jurassic Drumming".

Band History 

Team Cybergeist (2006–Present)
Dope (2006–2013)
Genitorturers (2001–2005, 2006, 2008, 2009)
Switched (2006–2010)
PIG (2006)
Crossbreed (2006)
The Undead (2001)
Other Bands include Rikets, Crooked, Gen-XX, Grim Faeries, PsyKill, In Winter, Betty X, EOg, MediaWhore, Triple Sixers, Opaquetourmaline, etc.

Endorsements 
DW Drums, PDP Drums, Zildjian Cymbals, ProMark Drumsticks, Evans Drumheads, Pintech Electronics, Westone In-Ear Monitors, DrumLite, Coffin Case and Wornstar Clothing.

See also 
KMFDM

References 

www.angelbartolotta.com

External links 
 Angel's official website

American heavy metal drummers
1981 births
Living people
People from Morristown, New Jersey
Musicians from New Jersey
Dope (band) members
Genitorturers members
21st-century American drummers